The 1884 Butler Christians football team represented Butler University during the 1884 college football season. The team beat DePauw in the first game in the state and lost to Wabash.

Schedule

See also
 List of the first college football game in each US state

References

Butler
Butler Bulldogs football seasons
Butler Christians football